Associazione Sportiva Dilettantistica Pontevecchio are an Italian association football club located in Ponte San Giovanni, a suburb of Perugia, Umbria. It currently play in Serie D.

History 
Pontevecchio was founded in 1945.

The coach Cosmi 
The club is known for having been coached by Serse Cosmi during the 1990s; during his tenure as head coach, the club achieved a number of promotions which led them from Prima Categoria to Serie D. After Cosmi left Pontevecchio to join Arezzo, the club quickly returned down to the lower divisions, and returned to Serie D only after having won the 2006–07 Eccellenza regional league; the same season they won the Coppa Italia Dilettanti, defeating Caserta in the final.

Colors and badge 
The colours of the team are green and orange.

Honours
 Coppa Italia Dilettanti
 Winners: 2006–07

External links 
 Official website

Football clubs in Italy
Association football clubs established in 1945
Football clubs in Umbria
1945 establishments in Italy